The 2005 French GP2 round was a GP2 Series motor race held on July 2 and July 3, 2005, at the Circuit de Nevers Magny-Cours in Magny-Cours, France. It was the fifth race of the 2005 GP2 Series season. The race was used to support the 2005 French Grand Prix.

The first race was won by Heikki Kovalainen for Arden International, with José María López second for DAMS and Nicolas Lapierre finishing third for Arden.

The second race was won by Nico Rosberg for ART Grand Prix, with Hiroki Yoshimoto for BCN Competición and Heikki Kovalainen for Arden also on the podium.

Classification

Qualifying

Feature Race

Sprint Race

Standings after the round 

Drivers' Championship standings

Teams' Championship standings

 Note: Only the top five positions are included for both sets of standings.

Notes

References

External links
 gp2.gpupdate.net

Magny-Cours Gp2 Round, 2005
Magny-Cours
Magny-Cours GP2 Series round